Three ships of the Royal Navy have been named HMS Guardian:

 was a 44-gun fifth rate launched in 1784, and converted to a transport ship in 1789. She struck an iceberg in the Southern Ocean that year, but was successfully beached, before being wrecked in a hurricane.
 was a net-laying and photographic ship launched in 1932 and scrapped in 1962.
 was a support ship bought for service in the Falkland Islands. She had originally been the civilian Seaforth Champion. She was sold in 1987.

References

Royal Navy ship names